Paul Dumas was a Parisian designer and manufacturer of wallpapers and textiles active between 1906 and 1978.

Dumas had a studio at 24-26 Rue Notre Dame des Victoires in Paris, and a printing factory in Montreuil-sur-bois, to the east of Paris. Dumas purchased a disused printing factory in Montreuil-sur-bois in 1906, and then built a larger factory on its land in 1913. The factory burned down in 1913, and Dumas had a new one built the same year.

Dumas was a designer of scenery and draperies for the fancy-dress balls held by Paul Poiret. The Montreuil-sur-bois factory produced wallpapers for Poiret's Atelier Martine, Paul Follot, Lina de Andrada, and Lucie Renudaut, among others.

Textiles produced by Paul Dumas are included in the collection of the Cooper Hewitt Design Museum. Wallpapers produced by Dumas in included in the collections of the Musée des arts décoratifs de Paris and the Victoria and Albert Museum, London and the Metropolitan Museum of Art.

References

19th-century French businesspeople